José Jorge Loureiro (23 April 1791 – 1 June 1860) was a Portuguese soldier and politician at the time of the monarchy.

Career 
He served as finance minister and from 18 November 1835 to 20 April 1836 he was Prime Minister of Portugal.

See also
Devorismo

External links 

1791 births
1860 deaths
Naval ministers of Portugal
People from Lisbon
Prime Ministers of Portugal
Finance ministers of Portugal
Government ministers of Portugal
Portuguese soldiers
University of Coimbra alumni
Portuguese military personnel of the Napoleonic Wars
Military personnel of the Liberal Wars